The Very Best of Enya is the second greatest hits album by the Irish singer, songwriter and musician Enya, released on 23 November 2009 by Warner Music. After promoting her previous studio album And Winter Came... (2008), Warner Music asked Enya to release a new compilation of her favourite songs of her career, and chose a selection with her longtime collaborators, producer and arranger Nicky Ryan and his wife, lyricist Roma Ryan.

The album received mostly positive reviews from music critics and peaked at number 32 on the UK Albums Chart and number 55 on the Billboard 200 in the United States. It spent over 100 weeks at number one on the Billboard New Age Albums chart. In a departure from her previous releases, Enya did not promote the album with interviews, appearances, or live performances.

Background 
After promoting her seventh studio album And Winter Came... (2008), Enya's label Warner Music requested that she release a new greatest hits album of her favourite songs of her career. She agreed to the project, and chose a selection with her longtime collaborators, producer and arranger Nicky Ryan and his wife, lyricist Roma Ryan. It is Enya's first greatest hits release since Paint the Sky with Stars (1997), but unlike the first collection, Enya did not record new tracks for the release. It includes a previously unreleased version of "Aníron" a song Enya wrote for the soundtrack to The Lord of the Rings: The Fellowship of the Ring (2001). The DVD included in the album's Limited and Deluxe Editions marks the first release of Enya's music videos in North America, following the cancellation of the proposed The Video Collection in 2001.

Release and reception 

The album was released on 23 November 2009 by Warner Music internationally and on 1 December 2009 by Reprise Records in the United States. It peaked at number 32 on the UK Albums Chart and number 55 on the Billboard 200 in the United States. It spent over 100 weeks at number one on the Billboard New Age Albums chart.

The Very Best of Enya received mostly positive reviews from music critics. James Christopher Monger of AllMusic wrote that the collection "was one of those rare 'greatest-hits' collections that goes deep without depriving the listener of the essentials. With tunes like 'Orinoco Flow', 'Caribbean Blue' and 'Book of Days' in the pot and out of the way, it's easier to appreciate hidden gems like 'Cursum Perficio', 'Boadicea', 'Trains and Winter Rains' and 'Anywhere Is'."

Track listing

Personnel 
Credits adapted from Allmusic and the album's sleeve notes.

 Musicians
 Enya – vocals
 Nicky Ryan - additional vocals
 Roma Ryan - additional vocals

 Production
 Enya - lyrics written by (6-8, 13), music composed by (1-18), musical arrangement
 Nicky Ryan – lyrics written by (7), music composed by (1, 3-18), musical arrangement, producer, recording engineer
 Roma Ryan – lyrics written by (1-15, 18), quotation author
 Franz Gruber - lyrics written by, music composed by (NA19)
 Traditional - lyrics written by, music composed by (NA19)
 Daniel Polley – digital technical advisor
 Dick Beetham – mastering at 360 Mastering, London
 Peacock – art direction, design
 Simon Fowler – photography
 David Scheinmann – photography
 Russell Young – photography
 Max Adelman – photography
 Ruth Rowland – lettering

Charts

Weekly charts

Year-end charts

Certifications and sales

Release history

References

External links 
 Enya's Official site
 

Enya compilation albums
2009 greatest hits albums
Warner Music Group compilation albums